Nezamabad (also Romanized as Nez̧āmābād) is a village in Rostaq Rural District, Rostaq District, Darab County, Fars Province, Iran. At the 2006 census, its population was 105, in 21 families.

References 

Populated places in Darab County